Brachycerus is a genus of weevils  in the family Curculionidae and the subfamily Brachycerinae.

Species

According to Catalogue of Life (August 30, 2014):

References 
  Zipcodezoo
  Biolib

Brachycerinae
Curculionidae genera